The 2000 IGA SuperThrift Tennis Classic was a women's tennis tournament played on indoor carpet courts at The Greens Country Club in Oklahoma City, Oklahoma in the United States that was part of the Tier III category of the 2000 WTA Tour. It was the 15th edition of the tournament and was held from February 21 through February 27, 2000. Second-seeded Monica Seles won the singles title and earned $27,000 first-prize money.

Finals

Singles
 Monica Seles defeated  Nathalie Dechy, 6–1, 7–6(7–3)
 It was Seles' 1st singles title of the year and the 45th of her career.

Doubles
 Corina Morariu /  Kimberly Po defeated  Tamarine Tanasugarn /  Elena Tatarkova, 6–4, 4–6, 6–2

References

External links
 ITF tournament edition details
 Tournament draws

IGA SuperThrift Classic
U.S. National Indoor Championships
IGA SuperThrift Tennis Classic
IGA SuperThrift Tennis Classic
IGA SuperThrift Tennis Classic